The Fairly OddParents: Shadow Showdown is a platforming video game released in 2004 for Microsoft Windows, GameCube, PlayStation 2, and Game Boy Advance by THQ. ImaginEngine developed the PC version while Blitz Games developed the GameCube and PlayStation 2 versions. The game is based on the animated series The Fairly OddParents and is the sequel to The Fairly OddParents: Breakin' da Rules.

It is the second and last Fairly OddParents video game released on consoles.

Plot
The game starts with Timmy Turner being excited to see a new special season finale episode of one of his favorite shows--Crash Nebula—on TV. However, he finds that his TV stops working just as it premieres, and the only other time it can be seen is a day later when it reruns. He attempts to have Cosmo and Wanda fix it through a wish, but they can't, since their wands aren't working.

The reason for this is that the Royal Jewel, the second most powerful source of fairy magic in existence, has been stolen, meaning that wish-granting powers have been disabled on a massive scale. Timmy goes on a mission to try to find out who stole the Jewel and turn him in, so that all will be returned to normal.  The first suspect is Quince, the royal jester in service of Oberon and Titania, rulers of Fairy World, who was recently fired for "not being funny."

After fighting Quince, Timmy has him interrogated by Jorgen von Strangle, but it turns out that Quince did not have the Jewel, and the only way to get it back was by using the magic of the first-most-powerful source of magic: the famous Fairyversary Muffin (first introduced in the Fairly OddParents TV-Movie "Abra-Catastrophe!").

To assemble the muffin, Timmy must bake it with magical forms of common cake ingredients, namely super strong hair raising flour, a phoenix egg, pixie sugar, and mooncalf milk. He somehow orders everything using the Internet, but Vicky snatches everything, and the ingredients are scattered in various places, such as in the possession of his parents or of Vicky herself (although the Phoenix Egg was destroyed).  With the ingredients compromised, the trio must work to recover everything and put together the muffin before it's too late.

Reception

Shadow Showdown received mixed reviews from critics.

References

2004 video games
Game Boy Advance games
GameCube games
Windows games
Video games developed in the United Kingdom
PlayStation 2 games
Platform games
3D platform games
THQ games
The Fairly OddParents
Shadow Showdown
Lua (programming language)-scripted video games
Video games with cel-shaded animation
Blitz Games Studios games
Single-player video games
ImaginEngine games